WELS is an acronym for Wisconsin Evangelical Lutheran Synod.

WELS may also refer to:

 WELS-FM, a radio station (102.9 FM) licensed to Kinston, North Carolina, United States
 WWMC, a radio station (1010 AM) licensed to Kinston, North Carolina, which held the call sign WELS until 2015
 "West of the Easterly Line of the State", a term of survey township in the US state of Maine
 WELS rating

See also
 Wels (disambiguation)